Kim Moon-soo (Hangul: 김문수; born August 27, 1951) is a Korean conservative politician and the 32nd Governor of Gyeonggi Province in South Korea. A former labor activist, he began his career in politics when he participated in the foundation of the People’s Party in 1990. He was elected to the 15th National Assembly at Sosa-gu, Bucheon, as a candidate for the New Korea Party. After continuing to serve as a member of the assembly in the 16th and the 17th National Assemblies, he became the 4th Governor of Gyeonggi Province to be elected by popular vote in 2006.

Early life and education
Born in 1951, Kim is the third son in his family, and has three brothers and three sisters. After graduating from Yeongcheon Elementary School in Gyeongsangbuk-do, he moved to Daegu Metropolitan City without his family, where he attended Gyeongbuk Middle School and Gyeongbuk High School.

In 1970, Kim Moon-Soo entered the Department of Business Administration, in the College of Business at Seoul National University, but was expelled in 1971 allegedly for participating in the October 15 nationwide student protests. In 1974, he was expelled from university again due to his involvement in the National Democratic Youth and Students Union case. 

He reentered the Department of Business Administration at Seoul National University in 1994, and two years later graduated from university, 25 years after his initial acceptance in 1970.

Career

Labor movement
In 1974, he served as the assistant cloth cutter at a fabric plant in Cheonggyecheon, acquiring national engineer’s licenses for environmental management and safety management in 1977. He was elected as the Dorco Labor Union Leader of the Federation of Korean Metal Workers Trade Unions in 1978. He was arrested and tortured by the dictatorial government in 1980, but his indictment was suspended so that he could serve for Dorco again. 

Kim served as the secretary of the Jun Tae-Il Memorial Society in 1985, and was arrested again for participating in the Incheon May 3 Protest for Constitutional Amendment for Direct Election System in 1986 when he served as the a member of the direction committee for Seoul Confederation of Labor Movement. He was tortured and was imprisoned for two and a half years.

Politics
In 1990, Kim Moon-Soo participated in the foundation of the Popular Party, and served as chair of the Labor Relations Committee. That same year, he ran in 1992 election as candidate No. 3, but was defeated. After joining the Democratic Liberal Party in 1994, he ran for the 15th general election as a candidate for New Korea Party in 1996, and was elected. (Sosa-gu, Bucheon)

Following his election, Kim Moon-Soo served as a member of the legislature, focusing on labor and environmental issues, as well as on transportation in the Seoul metropolitan area and childcare. Re-elected to the 16th and the 17th National Assemblies, Kim served for three consecutive terms as a member of the National Assembly. He served as the deputy floor leader for the Grand National Party. 

After retiring from the National Assembly in 2006 to run for local government, Kim was elected Governor of Gyeonggi Province, taking office as the 4th Governor elected by public vote in July 2006.

In April 2012, Kim Moon-Soo declared his presidential candidacy in the primary election of the Saenuri Party. In announcing his candidacy, Kim asserted that the nomination of Park Geun-hye should not be viewed as axiomatic, despite a decade of preparation for the campaign on her part.

Profile

Academic Background
 Graduated from College of Business, Seoul National University as a major in business administration / Ph. D.

Career Information(Source: Cyworld Mini Homepage)
 1996~2004 Member of the 15th and 16th National Assembly
Member of Environment and Labor Committee, Executive Committee, Budget and Account Committee, and Special Committee on Economic Reform and Unemployment
Deputy floor leader, deputy secretary general, and chair of the Planning Committee of the Grand National Party,
 2004~2006 Member of the 17th National Assembly
 2006~present Governor of Gyeonggi Province

Awards and citations
 2009. 4.16 Selected by Korea Manifesto as the No. 1 among the leaders of the 4th local governments elected by popular vote in the category of fulfillment of public pledge
 2007. 9. 5 Won the 5th Forbes Korea Excellence Award in the category of Public Innovations (Forbes Korea & Korean Society for Quality Management)
 2007. 8. 6 Selected by Korea Manifesto as No. 1 among the leaders of the 4th local governments elected by popular vote in the category of fulfillment of public pledges

Publications
 Statements of Appeal of Ten Prisoners of Conscience in the 1980s (1987)
 Report on Workers’ Rights in 1992 (1993)
 Innovation Tasks 20 (co-author, 1994)
 A Necktie Still Does Not Suit Me (1995)
 National Assemblymen Are the Servants of the Citizens
 Mr. President, Why Don’t You Take the Subway of Hell? (1996)
 My Way, My Dream (2006)
 I Dream of Freedom in Gyeonggi Province, a Prison of Regulations (2008)

Footnotes

External links

 
 

1951 births
Members of the National Assembly (South Korea)
Living people
Seoul National University alumni
Liberty Korea Party politicians
South Korean presidential candidates, 2012
South Korean Roman Catholics
Kyeongbuk High School alumni
Governors of Gyeonggi Province